Oak Hill Christian School is a private, classical Christian school located in Herndon, Virginia. Oak Hill was established in 1997 and offers classes in every grade pre-K through 12.

Oak Hill is a member of the Association of Classical and Christian Schools and uses the classical teaching method.

External links 
 Home Page
 Association of Classical Christian Schools

1997 establishments in Virginia
Christian schools in Virginia
Classical schools in Fairfax County, Virginia
Classical Christian schools
Educational institutions established in 1997
High schools in Fairfax County, Virginia
Private K-12 schools in Virginia